The 1963 Furman Paladins football team was an American football team that represented Furman University as a member of the Southern Conference (SoCon) during the 1963 NCAA University Division football season. In their sixth season under head coach Bob King, Furman compiled a 7–3 record, with a mark of 3–2 in conference play, placing fourth in the SoCon.

Schedule

References

Furman
Furman Paladins football seasons
Furman Paladins football